Port Albemarle (Spanish: Puerto Santa Eufemia) is a settlement on West Falkland, in the Falkland Islands. It is in the far south of the island, on the east side, at the southern end of Falkland Sound.

Owing to its large harbour, Albemarle became a successful sealing station, during the late 19th century, and the ruins of the buildings are still to be seen. It was enlarged during the post-World War II period by the Colonial Development Company like Ajax Bay, and included its own power station, jetty, Nissen huts etc.. These have all been abandoned, but there is still a sheep station here.

The Arch Islands are near here.

References

Populated places on West Falkland
History of the Falkland Islands